Chrysocraspeda nasuta is a species of moth of the family Geometridae. It is found in Madagascar.

This species has a wingspan of 24 mm.

References

External links
 Pictures at Boldsystem.org

Sterrhinae
Moths described in 1934
Lepidoptera of Madagascar
Moths of Madagascar
Moths of Africa